Hazel Wood High School, formerly known as Broad Oak Sports College, is a coeducational 11-16 secondary school located on Hazel Avenue about a mile to the east of Bury town centre in Greater Manchester, England. It is part of the Oak Learning Partnership.

History

Broad Oak High School was formed from various mergers, with previous schools including Ashmeadow, Bellgate, Seedfield and Wellington.

In 2019, the school changed its name from Broad Oak Sports College to Hazel Wood High School.

School organisation

When Ofsted visited in 2014, they found a smaller than average secondary school with a highly mobile population. It entered its mainly White British heritage students early for GCSE. This was classified as a good school.

In 2018 Ofsted judged the school had changed in many ways. There had been a large turnover of staff including two changes of headteacher, and the pupils now came from diverse backgrounds, many (a quarter) from families where English was not the mother tongue.
The school met the Department for Education's definition of a coasting school based on key stage 4 academic performance results in 2015 to 2017. Ofsted judged the school inadequate. The governors were removed and an Interim Executive Board put in place. The name of the school was changed.

The school are transitioning from the old curriculum inherited from Broad Oak, toward that of the 2020-2035 Strategy. For Key Stage 3, Year 7 is taught in mixed ability classes as would happen in a primary school. In year 8 and 9 students are setted in maths English and science. The sole language taught is Spanish. For Key Stage 4 there options allowing all English Baccalaureate choices.

Incidents
In 2012, a teacher, Ms Bailey, died by suicide. Evidence was given in an inquest that she was bullied by other staff members.
In June 2019, a student, twelve-year-old refugee Shukri Abdi, was found dead in the River Irwell. Her mother said that she had reported to the school that her child was being bullied repeatedly since twelve months prior to the incident. The school launched an internal investigation into bullying which concluded in August. Abdi's family criticised the report as insufficiently detailed and are still seeking Justice.

References

External links
Official website

Secondary schools in the Metropolitan Borough of Bury
Academies in the Metropolitan Borough of Bury
Schools in Bury, Greater Manchester